Need for Speed is a 2014 action thriller film directed and co-edited by Scott Waugh and written by George and John Gatins. It is the film adaptation of the racing video game franchise of the same name by Electronic Arts. The film stars Aaron Paul, Dominic Cooper, Scott Mescudi in his feature film debut, Imogen Poots, Ramón Rodríguez, and Michael Keaton. It tells the story of street racer Tobey Marshall, who sets off to race cross-country as a way of avenging his friend's death at the hands of a rival racer, Dino Brewster.

Need for Speed was released by Touchstone Pictures on March 14, 2014, in 3D, IMAX 3D, and conventional theaters. After its release, the film received generally negative reviews, criticized for its direction, nonsensical story, and acting of the supporting cast, though some praise for Paul's acting. The movie grossed $203 million worldwide.

Plot
Tobey Marshall is a former race car driver who owns his late father's garage, Marshall Performance Motors, in Mount Kisco, New York, where he and his friends tune performance cars. Struggling to make ends meet, he and his crew participate in street races after hours. After a race, Tobey's former rival Dino Brewster conscripts them into completing the build of a rare Ford Shelby Mustang worked on by the late Carroll Shelby, in exchange for 25% of the car's sales revenue. The completed Mustang is displayed for auction at a party in New York City. Tobey and Dino meet Julia Maddon, an English car broker whose client, Bill Ingram, wants to purchase the car if they can prove it will drive over 230 mph, as Tobey claims. Despite Dino's objections, Tobey takes the Mustang to a local race track and successfully drives it at 234 mph, convincing Ingram to purchase it for $2.7 million.

Enraged by Tobey's disobedience to his objections, Dino challenges Tobey and his friend Pete to a race after Pete flatly tells Dino that everyone knows Tobey is a better driver than him. Dino offers to relinquish his entire share of the Mustang sale if Tobey wins, otherwise Tobey will have to forfeit his share. He challenges them to race with his uncle's three Koenigsegg Agera R cars illegally imported from Europe. On the home stretch, realizing he is about to lose the race, Dino intentionally bumps into Pete's car, sending it down a ravine and killing Pete as it bursts into flames. Dino disappears from the scene, while Tobey is arrested by the police and sentenced to two years in prison for involuntary manslaughter, unable to prove Dino was there.

Upon his release on parole, Tobey sets out to avenge Pete's death. He borrows Ingram's Mustang to enter the De Leon, a winner-takes-all exotic car race organized by the mysterious Monarch, but as a condition, Ingram requires Julia to accompany Tobey while Tobey is driving the Mustang. The pair have 45 hours to reach San Francisco before the race starts. In Detroit, they cause an interstate chase with the Michigan State Police and upload the footage. Dino offers his rare Lamborghini Sesto Elemento to anyone who can stop Tobey entering the race, causing a group of truckers to go after the Mustang as well. Julia retaliates by convincing Monarch of Tobey's innocence, securing his invitation to the De Leon.

In Utah, Tobey and Julia are ambushed by truckers, forcing them off the road. Benny, a member of Tobey's crew, appears in a military helicopter stolen from the National Guard, and carries the Mustang mid-air to Tobey's crew at the Bonneville Salt Flats, getting himself arrested in the process. Tobey and Julia reach San Francisco's Mark Hopkins Hotel in time to register for the race, but on Nob Hill, a tow truck operated by one of Dino's henchmen smashes into the Mustang, wrecking it and injuring Julia. Desperate to get another car for the race, Tobey meets Dino's fiancée Anita, his ex-girlfriend and Pete's sister. Having discovered Dino's involvement in Pete's death, Anita gives Tobey the location of Dino's hidden Koenigsegg, which Tobey and crew member Joe extract. Tobey meets Julia at a San Francisco hospital, confessing his feelings for her with a kiss and letting her know that he has a "fast" car, and that this is for Pete.

The next morning, Tobey surprises Dino by not only showing up in the red Koenigsegg he drove when Pete was killed, but also giving him Anita's engagement ring, informing Dino that she is through with him. Besides the Koenigsegg and Dino's Lamborghini, the other participating cars and drivers include:
Texas Mike in the McLaren P1
Johnny V in the GTA Spano
The Gooch in the Saleen S7 Twin Turbo
English Paul in the Bugatti Veyron 16.4 Super Sport
In the ensuing race along the Pacific Coast Highway, the racers and pursuing California Highway Patrol officers crash one-by-one, leaving Tobey and Dino racing side-by-side. Dino attempts to ram Tobey the same way he killed Pete, but Tobey dodges, causing Dino to crash and flip over. Tobey pulls Dino from the wreckage before reaching the finish line, but not without punching Dino to avenge Pete; both are subsequently apprehended by the police, with Dino eventually convicted of the murder of Pete.

178 days later, Tobey is released, and Julia meets him at the prison gates in a 2015 Ford Mustang. The couple drives to a prison in Utah, where Benny is getting released early for good behavior.

Cast
 Aaron Paul as Tobey Marshall: a blue-collar mechanic and skilled former race car driver from Mount Kisco, New York who is framed for a federal crime he didn't commit.
 Dominic Cooper as Dino Brewster: a former Indy racer and Tobey's fierce rival.
 Imogen Poots as Julia Maddon: a savvy exotic car broker, who becomes Tobey's love interest.
 Scott Mescudi as Sergeant Benny "Maverick" Jackson: a member of Tobey's crew, and a former National Guard soldier. He is a pilot, able to fly small aeroplanes and helicopters, and is often called "Liar One" because fellow crew members don't believe he can fly a military helicopter, which he later proves. He owns a Cessna 182.
 Ramon Rodriguez as Joe "Beasty" Peck: a member of Tobey's crew. He is the crew's professional mechanic, and drives a modified 2011 Ford F-450 called "The Beast".
 Rami Malek as Finn: a member of Tobey's crew. He serves as the crew's computer expert, monitoring cameras to record races.
 Michael Keaton as "Monarch": a reclusive and eccentric host of an "underground" supercar race competition, De Leon. He operates from a lighthouse on a small farm where he lives.
 Dakota Johnson as Anita Coleman: Pete's older sister, Tobey's former girlfriend and Dino's fiancée.
 Harrison Gilbertson as Pete Coleman: Anita's younger brother and Tobey's protégé and friend.

Production
In July 2012, DreamWorks Studios was committed to a film based on the Need for Speed series of video games by Electronic Arts, initially with a release date of February 7, 2014, and later March 14, 2014. Brothers George and John Gatins had written a script that was being shipped to studios by April of that year. Taylor Kitsch was offered the lead role in July 2012, though the role eventually went to Aaron Paul that October. Paul had originally auditioned for the role of Dino Brewster, although director Scott Waugh and DreamWorks head Steven Spielberg decided against that and cast him as the lead. The same month, Imogen Poots was cast as the female lead. In January 2013, Dominic Cooper, Scott Mescudi, Ramón Rodríguez, Rami Malek and Harrison Gilbertson were cast in the film. Michael Keaton was cast in February 2013.

Principal photography began in Macon, Georgia, in mid-April 2013. Other filming locations include Road Atlanta in Braselton, Georgia, on May 12, 2013, the 13th Street Bridge in Columbus, Georgia and Phenix City, Alabama, and Campus Martius in Detroit, Michigan, beginning on June 1, 2013. Other production locations include sections of California's Highway 1 north of Point Arena, the Point Arena Lighthouse, and Highway 253 between Boonville and Ukiah; and also Highway 128, between the town of Navarro and the Navarro Bridge linking Highway 128 North to Highway 1 South to Point Arena.

For the film's chase sequences, the filmmakers decided against the use of computer-generated imagery, instead employing practical effects, which required the cast to receive intensive driving lessons. All of the exotic cars seen in the film (with the exception of the Mercedes-Benz SLR McLaren 722 Roadster) were kit car replicas.

Marketing and release
On September 25, 2013, a trailer for the film was released on iTunes. Disney and DreamWorks announced the film's post-production conversion to 3D on February 5, 2014. Need for Speed held its world premiere at the TCL Chinese Theatre on March 7, 2014. The film was released by Walt Disney Studios Motion Pictures through the Touchstone Pictures banner on March 14, 2014, in selected 3D, IMAX, and conventional 2D theaters. It was also released worldwide by Disney, except for territories in Europe, Africa and Middle East, where the rights are sold by Mister Smith Entertainment to other industries. Reliance Entertainment had released the film in India, while Entertainment One Films released it in the United Kingdom.

Need for Speed was released by Touchstone Home Entertainment on Blu-ray Disc, DVD and 3D Blu-ray on August 5, 2014.

Reception

Box office
Need for Speed grossed $43.6 million in North America and $159.7 million in other countries, for a worldwide total of $203.3 million.

In North America, it topped the box office with $6.7 million on its opening Friday, March 14, 2014. However, the film finished in third place over the three-day weekend with $17.8 million. Outside North America, the film debuted in first place with $45.6 million on the same weekend as its North America release. It remained in first place for a second weekend. Overall, the film's largest territory is China, where both the film's opening weekend ($21.1 million) and its total earnings ($66.2 million) are higher than in North America. Following these two territories in total earnings is Russia and the CIS with $13.8 million.

Critical response
The site's critical consensus reads, "With stock characters and a preposterous plot, this noisily diverting video game adaptation fulfills a Need for Speed and little else." On Metacritic, the film has a score of 39 out of 100 based on 38 critics, indicating "generally unfavorable reviews". Audiences polled by CinemaScore gave the film an average grade of "B+" on an A+ to F scale.

Michael Phillips of the Chicago Tribune gave the film 2.5 out of 4 stars, remarking that "Paul has talent, though the actor's idea of simmering intensity in the context of Need for Speed comes off more like a serial killer in the making. Cooper, by contrast, seems to be having some fun playing a dashing, dastardly, sexy beast." Phillips added, "At its occasional best, the thrills in the film recall the delirious fun of the Fast & Furious franchise." Betsy Sharkey of Los Angeles Times felt similarly, writing "In trying for the vicarious varoom of the street-racing video game that inspired it, and no doubt dreaming of Fast success, Speed clocks in at a long two-plus hours and falls painfully short." Jason Torchinsky of the automotive blog Jalopnik decried the movie for insulting gearheads with its far-reaching suspension of disbelief on many plot points and tropes and stated the film was nothing more than a glorified car commercial for the 2015 Ford Mustang.

Danny Korecki of automotive outlet The Drive discussed the thought that the Need for Speed film may have been better had it been a TV series.

A.O. Scott of The New York Times gave a more positive review, praising the film's car chase sequences, while declaring the overall film "an energetic, unpretentious B movie".

Soundtrack

The film's soundtrack, composed by Nathan Furst, was released by Varèse Sarabande on March 14, 2014. Interscope Records released a separate EP on April 8, 2014, which featured four songs; "Fortunate Son" and "Back in the Saddle" by Aloe Blacc, "All Along the Watchtower" by Jamie N Commons, and "Hero" by Kid Cudi featuring Skylar Grey. Linkin Park's song "Roads Untraveled" from their 2012 album Living Things was also featured in the film.
Score performed by a 77-piece The Angel City Studio Orchestra: 60-piece string orchestra conducted by Tim Davis and 17 musicians on brass section consists 8 French horns, three trumpets, five trombones and one tuba conducted by Suise Benchasil Seiter.

Track listing

Cancelled sequel
In 2015, China Movie Channel and Jiaflix Enterprises teamed up with EA Games to develop a sequel with the film to be set and shot in China. However, as of 2022, no progress has come of the sequel, indicating its possible cancellation.

See also
 List of films based on video games

Notes

References

External links

 
 

2014 action thriller films
2010s road movies
2010s chase films
2010s sports drama films
2014 3D films
2014 films
American 3D films
American action thriller films
American auto racing films
American chase films
American films about revenge
American road movies
Constantin Film films
DreamWorks Pictures films
Entertainment One films
Films about automobiles
Films directed by Scott Waugh
Films set in California
Films set in Detroit
Films set in Illinois
Films set in Indiana
Films set in Iowa
Films set in Michigan
Films set in Nebraska
Films set in Nevada
Films set in New Jersey
Films set in New York City
Films set in San Francisco
Films set in Utah
Films set in Westchester County, New York
Films shot in Alabama
Films shot in Detroit
Films shot in Georgia (U.S. state)
Films shot in Michigan
Films with screenplays by John Gatins
IMAX films
Indian 3D films
Indian action thriller films
Indian chase films
Indian films about revenge
Indian road movies
Live-action films based on video games
Reliance Entertainment films
Touchstone Pictures films
Works based on Electronic Arts video games
2014 drama films
2010s English-language films
2010s American films